During the Parade of Nations at the 2010 Winter Paralympics opening ceremony, which was held beginning at 6:00 PM PST on March 12, 2010, 44 athletes bore the flags of their respective nations and lead their national delegations as they paraded into BC Place Stadium in the host city of Vancouver, British Columbia, Canada.

The flag was borne by a sportsperson, from that country, chosen either by the National Paralympic Committee or by the athletes themselves to represent their country.

The following is a list of each country's flag bearer.

See also
2010 Winter Olympics national flag bearers

References

Flag bearers
Lists of Paralympic flag bearers